The Central District of Showt County is in West Azerbaijan province, Iran. At the National Census in 2006, the region's population (as a part of the former Showt District of Maku County) was 37,545 in 8,607 households. The following census in 2011 counted 39,569 people in 10,076 households, by which time the district had been separated from the county, Showt County established, and divided into two districts: the Central District and Qarah Quyun Districts. At the latest census in 2016, the district had 43,536 inhabitants in 12,169 households.

References 

Showt County

Districts of West Azerbaijan Province

Populated places in West Azerbaijan Province

Populated places in Showt County